The Rascoe-Harris Farm, also known as the Anderson Farm or Maplewood Farm, is a historic farmhouse in Sumner County, Tennessee, U.S.. It was built circa 1824 for Thomas Howell Rascoe, a farmer who owned six slaves in 1830. After the American Civil War of 1861–1865, some slaves became tenant farmers. The farm was purchased by Green B. Paris in 1891.

The house was designed in the Federal architectural style. It has been listed on the National Register of Historic Places since July 19, 1996.

References

Houses on the National Register of Historic Places in Tennessee
Federal architecture in Tennessee
Houses completed in 1824
Buildings and structures in Sumner County, Tennessee